Proaigialosaurus is an extinct genus of semi-aquatic diapsid reptile. The genus was erected by Kuhn (1958), based upon skull fragments, which have since been lost.

Generally considered the oldest specimen of the lizard family Aigialosauridae, others have considered it to be a pleurosaurid, a marine sphenodontian (the order to which the extant Tuatara belongs).

Proaigialosaurus was discovered in the Solnhofen limestone formation of Bavaria, Germany. It was small (less than a metre long).

References

Jurassic lepidosaurs
Solnhofen fauna
Fossil taxa described in 1958
Prehistoric reptile genera
Taxa named by Oskar Kuhn
Mosasaurs